The Gugulethu massacre was a mass shooting which occurred on the afternoon of 2 November 2020. It took place in a house in NY78, Gugulethu, Cape Town, South Africa and resulted in the death of eight people between the ages of 30 and 50 years old. One additional victim was injured in the shooting. Seven of the nine victims died on scene (3 women and 4 men) whilst an eighth victim died later in hospital.

Local residents reported to the media that the shooting was related to a gang conflict between the Guptas and the Boko Haram street gangs. Other reports by local residents indicated that the killing was conducted by the Boko Haram gang targeting a local woman, killed on scene, who refused to pay extortion money to the gang. Whilst the Gugulethu Development Forum stated that the killings were "drug-related."

References

2020 mass shootings in Africa
2020 murders in South Africa
21st-century mass murder in Africa
Mass shootings in South Africa
Massacres in 2020
2020s massacres in South Africa
November 2020 crimes in Africa
Western Cape